British singer Olly Alexander has released three studio albums, one extended plays, twenty six singles (including three as a featured artist and one promotional single), and nineteen music videos. Until 2021, Years & Years was a three-member band with Alexander as the lead vocalist, and their releases under the Years & Years name until that point were released by the band rather than by Alexander as a solo act. After Emre Turkmen and Mikey Goldsworthy left the band, Years & Years became Alexander's solo project, and all releases under that name from the 2021 single "Starstruck" onwards were solo releases. 

Years & Years' debut studio album, Communion, was released in 2015, charting at number one on the UK Albums Chart and obtaining Platinum status in the country. The band's debut single failed to chart in the UK, however, their third single "Desire" reached the UK top 40. Years & Years achieved global success and recognition for their 2015 single "King", which topped the UK charts and attained top-ten positions around the world. This was followed by "Shine" and "Eyes Shut". Three years later in 2018, Years & Years released their second album Palo Santo, which was accompanied by the singles "Sanctify" and "If You're Over Me". In 2021, Years & Years became a solo project and released the single "Starstruck".

Studio albums

Extended plays

Singles

As lead artist

As featured artist

Promotional singles

Other charted songs

Guest appearances

Music videos

Notes

References

Discographies of British artists
Electronic music discographies